Mambo Italiano is a 2003 Canadian comedy-drama film directed by Émile Gaudreault. The screenplay was written by Gaudreault and Steve Galluccio, based on Galluccio's theatrical play by the same name. Both the play and the film are based on Galluccio's own life and experiences.

Plot
Angelo Barberini is the oddball son of Italian immigrants Gino and Maria, who inadvertently ended up in Canada rather than the United States. Angelo shocks his parents – and his sister, Anna – by moving out on his own without getting married, and, shortly after that, shocks them further still when he reveals he is gay. But his boyfriend (and childhood best friend), policeman Nino Paventi, isn't as ready to come out of the closet – especially not to his busybody Sicilian mother, Lina.

Cast
 Luke Kirby as Angelo Barberini
 Claudia Ferri as Anna Barberini
 Peter Miller as Nino Paventi
 Paul Sorvino as Gino Barberini
 Ginette Reno as Maria Barberini
 Mary Walsh as Lina Paventi
 Sophie Lorain as Pina Lunetti
 Tim Post as Peter
 Tara Nicodemo as Yolanda/Woman in Airplane/Jolene
 Pierrette Robitaille as Rosetta
 Dino Tavarone as Giorgio
 Mark Camacho as Johnny Christofaro
 Michel Perron as Father Carmignani
 Lou Vani as Marco
 Diane Lavallée as Mélanie

Production
Mambo Italiano was based on a play by Steve Galluccio, which was written based on his own real-life experiences growing up in an immigrant community in Montreal.

Reception
Mambo Italiano received mixed to negative reviews, currently holding a 32% rating on Rotten Tomatoes; the consensus states: "A broad, shrill comedy that plays like a sitcom." On Metacritic, the film has a 41/100 rating, indicating "mixed or average reviews".

Scott Brown from Entertainment Weekly wrote "This is feel-good filmmaking, to be sure, but the culture clash here is more than a meaningless vehicle for fizzy wish fulfillment. The not-unpleasant result is hearty Italian fare with the half-life of Chinese takeout."

Janice Page from the Boston Globe wrote "No sophisticated dance, but it moves about with an open heart. And hey, it’s at least as funny as that Greek thing."
Chicago Sun-Times Roger Ebert gave the film a modest two stars and refers to the film "in convenience" as "My Big Fat Gay Wedding".

Follow-up
Galluccio went on to create the sitcom Ciao Bella, which explored similar themes of culture clash that are examined in this film and the play it was based upon. Claudia Ferri, who played Angelo's sister Anna in Mambo Italiano, played the lead role in Ciao Bella.

References

External links
 
 
 
 
 

2003 films
2003 comedy-drama films
Canadian comedy-drama films
Canadian LGBT-related films
English-language Canadian films
2000s English-language films
Italian-language Canadian films
2000s French-language films
Films directed by Émile Gaudreault
Films set in Montreal
Films shot in Montreal
Canadian independent films
LGBT-related comedy-drama films
2003 independent films
2003 LGBT-related films
2003 comedy films
2003 drama films
Canadian films based on plays
French-language Canadian films
2000s Canadian films
2003 multilingual films
Canadian multilingual films